Cyne, often stylized as CYNE ("Cultivating Your New Experience"; pronounced "sign"), is an American alternative hip hop group originating from Gainesville, Florida. The group consists of MCs Akin Yai and Clyde "Cise Starr" Graham, and producers David "Enoch" Newell and Michael "Speck" Gersten, and are currently signed to Hometapes.

History

Cyne (Cultivating Your New Experience) formed in the summer of 2001. The group consists of vocalists Akin and Cise Star and producers Speck and Enoch. They are a Hip Hop group originating from Gainesville, Florida, USA. The group aim to create sincere Hip Hop music with a message: Their tracks are politically charged, with culturally introspective, motivational lyrical content influenced by artists such as Public Enemy, Paris, Lakim Shabazz, C.L. Smooth and the early work of Common.
The production backing the vocals of Akin and Cise Star is warm, soulful and organic, influenced by producers such as No I.D., Pete Rock and J Dilla. The group’s first release was the 12” ‘African Elephants’ on the Beta Bodega label Rice and Beans in 2001. Since this initial release the group have released several Eps and 12”s, have collaborated with artists such as Daedelus, Four Tet and Machinedrum and have performed with EL-P, KRS-One, Talib Kweli, Dalek, Atmosphere, The Beatnuts, The Roots, Sage Francis, Against Me!, Holopaw, Big Jus, Mr. Lif, ISIS, Push Button Objects and many more. They have previously released albums on Botanica Del Jibaro, P-Vine, Project: Mooncircle, Home Tapes and City Centre Offices, creating a reputation as artists that stay true to the lyrical power and gritty cut and paste aesthetic of classic Hip Hop whilst managing to explore new sonic territory.

CYNE's 2005 release Evolution Fight was named Album of the Week at Stylus Magazine for the week of August 29 – September 3, 2005. In 2007, CYNE released the Grey Matter EP on their website to be downloaded, free of charge. In 2014, the group released a studio album, All My Angles Are Right, on Hometapes.

Style and influences
Their often socio-politically charged, culturally introspective, and motivational lyrics find influence rooted in blues, jazz, highlife, activism, humanities and philosophy.

Discography

Studio albums
 Time Being (2003)
 Evolution Fight (2005)
 Tour CD 2005 (2005)
 Starship Utopia (2008)
 Pretty Dark Things (2008)
 Water for Mars (2009)
 All My Angles Are Right (2014)

Compilation albums
 Cyne (Collection 1999-2003) (2003)
 Wasteland Vol. 1: Killmore (2011)
Wasteland Vol. 2 (2017)

EPs
 Movements (2002)
 Growing (2004)
 Running Water (2005)
 Grey Matter (2007)

Singles
 "African Elephants" (2001)
 "Midas" (2002)
 "Out of Time" (2003)
 "Due Progress" (2003)

Guest appearances
 Supersoul - "Sattva Guna (Make It Happen!)" from 40 Acres and a Moog (2002)
 Nujabes - "Lady Brown" and "High 2 Lows" from Metaphorical Music (2003), "Feather" from Modal Soul (2005), "D.T.F.N" from Hydeout Productions (First Collection) (2003), "Sky is Tumbling" from Spiritual State (2011)
 Daedelus - "Drops" from Exquisite Corpse (2005)
 Depth Affect - "One Day or So" from Arche-Lymb (2006)
 Deceptikon - "Montana" from Greater Cascadia (2007)
 Supersoul - "Satellites" from Plastic Rap (2007)
 Seven Star - "Speak the Truth" (2008)
 Haruka Nakamura - "The Sun" from Melodica (2013)
 Ficus - "Level Up" from Black Foliage (2013)
 Uyama Hiroto - Soul of Freedom from Freedom of the Son (2014)

References

External links
 
 

Alternative hip hop groups
American hip hop groups
Musical groups from Gainesville, Florida
Musical groups established in 2000
2000 establishments in Florida